Amaroni is a town and  in the province of Catanzaro, in the Calabria region of southern Italy.

Twin towns
  Risch-Rotkreuz, Switzerland

Cities and towns in Calabria